Tando Allahyar  is a city and capital of Tando Allahyar District located in Sindh, Pakistan. It is the 56th largest city of Pakistan by population according to the 2017 census.

History 
Tando Allahyar was founded during the rule of Talpur, of the Mir clan. When Bachal Yousfani was mayor, inns and guest houses were built as well as colonies for residents and jobs were created.

Watayo Faqir's shrine 
The shrine of the sindhi oracle and that man was presented thinks his own wisdom Sufi poet Watayo Faqir lies at Kuba Shareef near Rashidabad.

1709 fort construction 
The fort was built to provide security for the Mir and the people of the area. It also functioned as a trading post. As the township developed around the fort, it was known as "Allahyar Jo Tando" (Allahyar's Town). The fort is now called "Kacho Qilo". Some walls decorated at the time of the Mir remain.

British rule 
In 1906, during the British Raj, a railway station was established. It reflected the town's growing importance as a centre of agriculture and trade. The name of the town changed from "Allahyar Jo Tando" to "Tando Allahyar". The British Raj took the fort for its official use.

Canal 

In 1933, a canal was constructed. It further increased Tando Allahyar's importance in agriculture and trade.

Independence 
Prior to 1947, the majority of inhabitants of Tando Allahyar were Hindu. The temple of Baba Ramdevji Rama-Pir was a symbol of Hindu–Muslim unity and peaceful co-existence. After independence of Pakistan, many Hindu followers left. Nevertheless, the temple, located in the town centre, remains a popular destination for Hindu pilgrims.

The predominantly Muslim population supported Muslim League and Pakistan Movement.  After the independence of Pakistan in 1947, the minority Hindus and Sikhs migrated to India while the Muslim refugees from India settled in the Tando Allahyar District.

Ramapir Temple

The Rama Pir Mandir is a temple of Ramdev Pir in Tando Allahyar. It is the second largest pilgrimage site for the Hindus in Pakistan. Every year in Bhadrapada month of Hindu calendar, here the three days Mela arranged by Ramapir Seva Mandali.

Location 
Tando Allahyar is a railway hub for the Sindh region. Early in the nineteenth century, members of the Bozdar family, a community from the Suleiman Mountains, founded the settlements of Khan Muhammad Bozdar (a nearby village of 52 houses), Massu Bozdar, and Dhangano Bozdar.

Demography

Population
 the population of Tando Allahyar and its immediate surroundings was 400,000. 30% of the population are Muslim immigrants from India who arrived after independence of Pakistan in 1947. 70% are indigenous Sindhi inhabitants. There are a significant number of Urdu, Baloch, Punjabi, and Pashto speaking people in Tando Allahyar.

Hindu temples
 Shri Ramapir
 Rama Pir

Climate
Tando Allahyar is hot throughout the year. Nights often have cool breezes throughout the year.

Agriculture 
Tando Allahyar is one of Pakistan's richest agricultural regions. Cash crops like sugarcane, wheat, onion and cotton are cultivated. Mangoes and bananas are also grown. There are sugar mills and some cotton ginning factories.

Mohsin Rasheed Memon Mango Farm on Mir Wah road 3 km from the city centre is a major mango farm. It has Sindhri, dashari, langra, Anwer Ratol, Siroli and Patasha variety.

Religion
Tando Allahyar's population is predominantly Shia and Sunni Islam. There is also a small Hindu community that exists in the city that mainly engages in business and in rural areas Hindu communities engage in agriculture. There are a few shrines in the city in different areas like Bukera Sharif also there is a very old madrasa in the city with the name of Darul Uloom once called "Saniye Darul Uloom".

Culture
Tando Allahyar has a rich traditional Sindhi culture. Women may wear a Shalwar Kameez but often wear the traditional dress, the gharara or "parro". Traditionally, many bangles are worn on the arms. Men wear a Shalwar Kameez distinguished by broader bottoms and a traditional Sindhi-style cap. The youth may appear in western styles.

Languages
Sindhi,  Siraiki and Urdu,  are the main languages spoken. Other languages including Rajisthani Qaimkhani Khanzada, dhatki, Marwari, Balochi Punjabi and Brahui as well some Dravidian languages.

Architecture
Tando Allahyar is a bustling town with mango tree lined streets. Old buildings are topped by chimney-like air cooling devices that catch the breeze.

Education
Rates of literacy are greater in the urban than the rural areas of Tando Allahyar.

Tando Allahyar is a marginalised, lower-income area, with state involvement limited to constructing school buildings and providing teachers. Teachers receive little training and have tended to follow an old-fashioned, authoritarian model of teaching; Zahid Shahab Ahmed noted in 2017 that some teachers had expressed unfamiliarity with the concept of participatory classes where students were encouraged to develop independent critical-thinking ability. Education in Tando Allahyar is generally in Urdu due to its widespread familiarity among students.

External links
 Sunset at Tando Allahyar
 Demographs of Tando Allahyar
 Local Government of Sindh

References

Populated places in Sindh
Tando Allahyar District
Shiva temples
History of Pakistan
Ruins in Pakistan